Culture Abuse was an American rock band, originally hailing from San Francisco. The band released two full-length albums. The first album, titled Peach, was released in 2016 on 6131 Records. In 2018, Culture Abuse signed to Epitaph Records and released their second full-length album titled Bay Dream. Besides their music, the band is notable for their lead singer, David Kelling, having cerebral palsy.  Kelling sought to fight the media narrative of "a normal human, then you have a disabled person" and show parents that "their kid can be a hero too". 
Culture Abuse disbanded as of July 2020 due to sexual misconduct allegations against Dave Kelling.

In 2021, the song "So Busted" was featured at the end credits for The Suicide Squad.

Discography
Studio albums
Peach (2016, 6131 Records)
Bay Dream (2018, Epitaph Records)

References

Epitaph Records artists
Musical groups from San Francisco
Musical groups established in 2013
2013 establishments in California